Discovery Geschichte ("Discovery History") was a German television channel focusing on history-related programmes owned by Discovery Networks Europe. The channel launched on March 31, 2005, on the Premiere platform.

Overview
The service was discontinued as a full 24-hour channel on May 16, 2009, after Premiere had signed a new contract with Discovery Networks Deutschland in preparation for Premiere's relaunch as Sky Deutschland in July. On Premiere, Discovery Geschichte was replaced by National Geographic Channel Germany the following day. Discovery Geschichte continues as a programming block on DMAX.

References

External links

Warner Bros. Discovery networks
Defunct television channels in Germany
German-language television stations
Mass media in Munich
Television channels and stations established in 2005
Television channels and stations disestablished in 2009
2005 establishments in Germany
2009 disestablishments in Germany